Olyka Castle was the principal seat of the Radziwiłł princely family in Volhynia (nowadays in Ukraine) from 1564 until the late 18th century. The founder of the castle was Prince Mikołaj "the Black" Radziwiłł (1515–1565) who gave Olyka to his youngest son Stanisław. Two senior branches of the Radziwiłł family were based in Nesvizh and Kletsk.

The Olyka Castle was immensely influential as the first square fort with corner bastions in the Kresy (eastern territories of the Kingdom of Poland) and the prototype of many similar structures found in Eastern Europe. It was almost continuously under construction for eight decades and sustained numerous sieges between 1591 and 1648. It is probably the biggest aristocratic residence in Ukraine, with 365 rooms. 

During Napoleon's invasion of Russia a Russian military hospital moved in and continued in use until 1837. An 1840 document refers to the castle as untenanted. In 1883, a campaign of restoration was launched but it was not taken to its conclusion until after the First World War.

The Olyka Castle comprises four residential buildings of unequal height, forming a court in the middle and encircled by a moat. The towers of the original castle have crumbled to the ground, but the network of bastions is still in place. The main palace of three storeys, although originally built in the 16th century, is essentially the upshot of renovations carried out in the 17th and 18th centuries.

Other buildings of the castle complex include a 17th-century gateway, a two-storey clock tower, and the Collegiate Church of the Holy Trinity (1635–1640), an elaborate replica of Il Gesu.

During the German occupation of Poland (World War II), the Radziwiłł Fortress was the site of Nazi German persecution of Ołyka Jews in the Holocaust. As part of the Einsatzgruppen action of August 1941, 720 Jews were murdered at the Olyka Castle and nearby. In July 1942, several hundred more Jews were killed in the castle. Memorials outside Olyka mark the place of execution of more than 4,000 Jews in Summer 1942in and around the Olyka ghetto, Radziwiłł Fortress, Olyka Castle, and surrounding areas. Israel's Holon Cemetery also has a memorial to the murdered Jews of Olyka and surrounding areas.

A psychiatric hospital, Volyn’s Hospital No. 2, is now located at the site of the Olyka Castle. The only part of the castle currently closed for visitors is a chamber for the Princes and their servants.

References

External links 
 

Castles in Ukraine
Buildings and structures in Volyn Oblast
1564 establishments in Poland
Castles and palaces of the Radziwiłł family
Palaces in Ukraine
Tourist attractions in Volyn Oblast
16th-century establishments in Ukraine
Holocaust locations in Ukraine